This is a list of the publications of Arthur Ashley Sykes (1684–1756), an English cleric who wrote controversial pamphlets over three or four decades, arguing a latitudinarian and rationalist line, and playing a part in the Bangorian controversy.

References
Samuel Halkett, Catherine Laing, John Laing, Henry Benjamin Wheatley, A Dictionary of the Anonymous and Pseudonymous Literature of Great Britain (1882)

Notes

Bibliographies by writer